Exocoetoides is an extinct genus of prehistoric ray-finned fish.

Etymology
The Latin genus name is derived from its resemblance to Exocoetus, a modern-day flying fish.

Description
The main characteristic of these decidedly small fishes was given by the extreme development of the even fins. In particular, the pectoral fins were particularly long (they could reach the anal region). Also the pelvic fins were large. Moreover the fins were provided with very long rays. In the caudal fin both lobes were the same size.

Like today's modern-day flying fish they were also likely to perform a sort of gliding flight over water, thanks to the notable expansion of the pectoral and pelvic fins.

Fossil record
These fishes were widespread in the ancient Tethys Ocean, in the areas currently occupied by the Middle East and Europe. They lived in the Upper Cretaceous (Cenomanian - Santonian, about 95 - 85 million years ago). Their fossils have been found in Lebanon and in Europe (Croatia).

References

External links
 Planet Terre

Note: This article has been expanded using material based on a translation of an article from the Italian Wikipedia.

Prehistoric aulopiformes
Prehistoric ray-finned fish genera
Cretaceous bony fish
Prehistoric fish of Africa